Baron Samedi, also written Baron Samdi, Bawon Samedi or Bawon Sanmdi, is one of the lwa of Haitian Vodou. He is a lwa of the dead, along with Baron's numerous other incarnations Baron Cimetière, Baron La Croix and Baron Criminel.

He is the head of the Gede family of lwa; his brothers are Azagon Lacroix and Baron Piquant and he is the husband of Maman Brigitte. Together, they are the guardians of the past, of history, and of heritage.

Portrayal 
Baron Samedi is usually depicted with a top hat, black tail coat, dark glasses, and cotton plugs in the nostrils, as if to resemble a corpse dressed and prepared for burial in the Haitian style. He is frequently depicted as a skeleton (but sometimes as a black man that merely has his face painted as a skull), and speaks in a nasal voice. The former President-for-Life of Haiti, François Duvalier, known as Papa Doc, modeled his cult of personality on Baron Samedi; he was often seen speaking in a deep nasal tone and wearing dark glasses.

He is noted for disruption, obscenity, debauchery, and having a particular fondness for tobacco and rum. Additionally, he is the lwa of resurrection, and in the latter capacity he is often called upon for healing by those near or approaching death, as it is only the Baron that can accept an individual into the realm of the dead.

Due to affiliation with François Duvalier, Baron Samedi is linked to secret societies in the Haitian government and includes them in his domain.

Baron Samedi spends most of his time in the invisible realm of vodou spirits. He is notorious for his outrageous behavior, swearing continuously and making filthy jokes to the other spirits. He is married to another powerful spirit known as Maman Brigitte, but often chases after mortal women. He loves smoking and drinking and is rarely seen without a cigar in his mouth or a glass of rum in his bony fingers. Baron Samedi can usually be found at the crossroads between the worlds of death and the living. When someone dies, he digs their grave and greets their soul after they have been buried, leading them to the underworld.

Connection to other lwa 
Baron Samedi is the leader of the Gede, lwa with particular links to magic, ancestor worship and death. These lesser spirits are dressed like The Baron and are as rude and crude but not nearly as charming as their master.  They help carry the dead to the underworld.

Activities 
As well as being the master of the dead, Baron Samedi is also a giver of life. He can cure mortals of any disease or wound, so long as he thinks it is worthwhile. His powers are especially great when it comes to Vodou curses and black magic. Even if somebody has been afflicted by a hex that brings them to the verge of death, they will not die if The Baron refuses to dig their grave. So long as The Baron keeps them out of the ground, they are safe.

In many Haitian cemeteries, the longest standing grave of male is designated as the grave of Baron Samedi. A cross (the kwa Bawon, meaning "Baron's cross") is placed at a crossroads in the cemetery to represent the point where the mortal and spiritual world cross. Often, a black top hat is placed on top of this cross.

He also ensures that all corpses rot in the ground to stop any soul from being brought back as a zombie. What he demands in return depends on his mood. Sometimes he is content with his followers wearing black, white or purple clothes or using sacred objects; he may simply ask for a small gift of cigars, rum, black coffee, grilled peanuts, or bread. But sometimes The Baron requires a Vodou ceremony to help him cross over into this world.

In other media

Television 
 Appears in the second season of Cloak & Dagger, portrayed by Justin Sams. In the episode "Two Player", Samdi resided in the Dark Dimension and could notably be found at Fun Arcade Games, an arcade house in which he was visited by Tyrone Johnson, who let him stay to play the game Duel to D'Spayre, arcade game and refusing to return into the real world as he felt that there was nothing good for him there. Samdi eventually got a second visitor to his store: Tandy Bowen, who had come to bring back her friend and decided to let him have the opportunity to complete his mission and allowed him to play with Tyrone, promising to let them both go if Tandy managed to convince Tyrone to leave. It turned out that Tandy was unable to complete the game due to him facing D'Spayre in his final stage. After Tandy begged Tyrone to come home and insisted on knowing his answer. However, during the time Tyrone hesitated, Samedi learned that Evita Fusilier had married him in exchange for Tyrone's life. As a result, Samdi expelled Tandy and Tyrone from the Dark Dimension to prepare to meet his girlfriend.
 Baron Samedi is revealed to be the true identity of Mambo Marie LeFleur, portrayed by Skye Marshall, in the fourth season of Chilling Adventures of Sabrina, introduced in the third season, developing a romantic relationship with Zelda Spellman.
 Appears in the second season of American Gods, portrayed by Mustafa Shakir.
Portrayed by British actor Daniel Francis as Dr. Facilier/ Baron Samdi in 8 episodes of the final season of Once Upon A Time Episodes # 5, 12, 14, 15, 17, 18, 19 & 20.
Appears in the Supernatural season five episode "Hammer of the Gods."
Is one of the available player chapters of Atmosfear: The Harbingers - an Australian video board game designed by Brett Clements and Phillip Tanner and published by Mattel as a major update to the Atmosfear series.
 Appears in three episodes of Grimm
 In Heroes, a man known as "Baron Samedi" exists with the power of invulnerability and the brother of The Haitian. He was portrayed by Demetrius Grosse.
 Appears in the season 7 MacGyver episode "Walking Dead"
 Appears in the third season of American Horror Stories, titled Coven, under the name of Papa Legba, portrayed by actor Lance Reddick. Dressed in top hat, black frock tails and dark glasses, his face is painted as a partial skull all in the traditional guise of Baron Samedi.

Film 
 Appears as a villain in Live and Let Die, portrayed by Geoffrey Holder.
 Appears in Sugar Hill, portrayed by Don Pedro Colley.
 Appears in Zombi Child, portrayed by Nehémy Pierre-Dahomey.
 The Disney villain character Dr. Facilier in the 2009 animated film The Princess and the Frog is inspired by Baron Samedi. the Film also Implies that the Friends from the Other side Serve under him as well.

Video games 
 Appears as a playable character in the 2014 multiplayer online battle arena Smite, he was introduced in 2018.
 Appears as an avatar of Nyarlathotep in the seventh edition of Call of Cthulhu 
 Appears as a playable character in the James Bond games Goldeneye 007 (1997), James Bond 007: Nightfire (2002), James Bond 007: Everything or Nothing (2003), and 007 Legends (2012)
 Appears as a character in Akuji the Heartless (1998)
 A rival gang in the game Saints Row 2 are the Sons of Samedi, a gang with heavy vodou influences.
 A doll of the Baron can be found in Gibbous – A Cthulhu Adventure at the vodou Gentleman's place
 A zombified version of Baron Samedi is called "Baron von Bats" in Plants vs. Zombies: Garden Warfare.
 A character who styles himself after Baron Samedi in Shadowrun Returns is a Decker allied to the player.

Others 
 One of the gods appearing in the comic book miniseries Loki: Ragnarok and Roll.
 Inspired the character of Chimney Man in the musical Jelly's Last Jam.
 Appears as an entity in Cyberspace in Count Zero by William Gibson, the sequel to Neuromancer
A privilege escalation vulnerability caused by a heap-based buffer overflow in the computer program sudo was named "Baron Samedit" as a combination of "Baron Samedi" and sudoedit (the vulnerable application).
 Inspired the character of Papa Shango in the WWE portrayed by Charles Wright.
 Baron Saturday, a character analogous with Baron Samedi, appeared in the novel Witches Abroad from Terry Pratchett’s Discworld Series. Previously the ruler of Genua, he was murdered by Lady Lilith de Tempscire in order to enable a version of the Cinderella story to play out, but was resurrected as a zombie by Erzulie Gogol, a vodou witch and his former lover.
 Appears as a playable character in the video board game Nightmare (1991), and hosts the game's first expansion (where he is played by Wenanty Nosul).
 Baron Saturday, who represents Baron Samedi, appears in the album S.F. Sorrow by The Pretty Things, where he takes the titular character on a trip through the Underworld and shows him horrible truths and revelations about his life.
 A major character in the podcast Desperado. To save the life of Talia, one of the three main characters, he was granted her life and can possess her at any time.
 Is the title of a song by British rock band 10cc, appearing on their 1974 album, Sheet Music.
 Is discussed extensively in the four-part podcast titled Real Dictators: Papa Doc François Duvalier. Narrated by English actor Paul McGann, Duvalier and his purposeful adoption of Baron Samedi's dress, voice, and actions to frighten the Haitian people in order to further exploit them for his own political agenda.
 Inspired the character of The Spirit of Jazz in the British comedy TV series The Mighty Boosh

References

Bibliography 
 Voodoo: Search for the Spirit, “Abrams Discoveries” series. Laënnec Hurbon. Harry N. Abrams, Inc. 1995. "Ghede"
 A Dictionary of World Mythology. Arthur Cotterell. Oxford University Press, 1997. "Vodou".
 The Voodoo Gods. Maya Deren. Granada Publishing Limited 1975.
 
Taylor, P. (1992). Anthropology and Theology in Pursuit of Justice. Callaloo, 15(3), 811–823. https://doi.org/10.2307/2932023
Hayes, A. M., & Robinson, M. (2001). Instructional Resources Haitian Art: Exploring Cultural Identity. Art Education, 54(1), 25–32. https://doi.org/10.2307/3193890

External links 

 The Dead: Baron, Brijit and Gede
 Can vodoo succeed where Western medicine fails?

Haitian Vodou gods
Death gods
Love and lust deities
Love and lust gods
Supernatural beings identified with Christian saints